Sher-Gil is a crater on Mercury. Its name was adopted by the International Astronomical Union in 2016, after the Indian painter.

Hollows are present within Sher-Gil crater.

To the southwest of Sher-Gil is Neruda crater.

References

Impact craters on Mercury